Lubabalo Nicholas Kondlo (born December 21, 1971) is a player of English draughts (also known as American checkers) from South Africa. He holds the title of grandmaster, and is the current world champion in the GAYP (go as you please) version.

Career
Born in New Brigton, Port Elizabeth, Kondlo started to play draughts at the age of seven years. In 2007, he won the World Qualifier in Las Vegas, United States and became the first draughts grandmaster from Africa.

His match against Ron King in 2008 for the world champion title in the GAYP version was the subject of the documentary King Me. In 2012 he won the silver medal, the gold being won by Alex Moiseyev, in American checkers at the SportAccord World Mind Games in Beijing, China. Kondlo won the 2014 World Qualifying 3-Move Tournament in Clarksville, Indiana, U.S. edging out Sergio Scarpetta on head-to-head tie-breaker. Thanks to this victory, he earned the right to challenge Michele Borghetti in the world championship match in the 3-move version. The match took place in 2015 in Livorno, Italy and was won by Borghetti. In 2018, in Petal, Mississippi, US Kondlo won the world title match in the GAYP version against defending champion Borghetti. Kondlo is the first world draughts champion from Africa.
On 30th April 2022, he lost the world title after his defeat from the Italian Matteo Bernini.

Test matches

Although there have not been nearly enough international test matches between countries, Lubabalo has played in:

References

External links

1971 births
Living people
Players of English draughts
Sportspeople from Port Elizabeth